Daviesia physodes is a species of flowering plant in the family Fabaceae and is endemic to near-coastal areas of south-western Western Australia. It is an open shrub with verically flattened or tapering, sharply-pointed phyllodes, and yellow and pink to red flowers.

Description

Taxonomy and naming
Daviesia physodes was first formally described in 1832 by George Don in his book A General History of Dichlamydeous Plants from an unpublished manuscript by Allan Cunningham. The specific epithet (physodes) means "a pair of bellows", referring to the bladdery fruit of this species.

Distribution and habitat
This bitter-pea grows in open forest or kwongan between Geraldton, Augusta and Narrogin in near-coastal areas of the Geraldton Sandplains, Jarrah Forest and Swan Coastal Plain biogeographic regions of south-western Western Australia.

References

physodes
Flora of Western Australia
Plants described in 1832
Taxa named by George Don